First proposed in 1965 an assembly bonus effect requires  demonstration of group performance which exceeds the combined contributions of individual group members.  There is evidence for both task-specific assembly bonus effects, and a general effect of collective intelligence, analogous to that of general intelligence.

References

Psychological effects
Group processes